Neel 45 is a cruising trimaran designed by Joubert-Nivelt and produced by Neel Trimarans.

Reception
The boat was selected among the Best Boats of 2013 by Sail Magazine and praised for its speed, comfort, construction quality and ergonomics, but criticized for its learning curve and a need for power winches. It was also praised by Cruising World, being awarded 'Most Innovative' for 2013 and garnering compliments for its interior design, performance and detailing.

See also
List of multihulls
Trimaran

References

External links
Neel Trimarans: Neel 45

Trimarans
Sailboat type designs by Joubert-Nivelt